Microdigital Eletrônica Ltda. was an influential Brazilian computer company in the 1980s, based in São Paulo.

History 
Established in 1981 by the brothers George and Tomas Kovari (whose initials were the TK of the domestic computers line made by the company), its first product was the TK80, a clone of the British microcomputer Sinclair ZX80.

The company reached its height around 1985, with the launching of the TK90X (clone of the ZX Spectrum) and the TK 2000/II, a personal computer partially compatible (at Applesoft BASIC level) with the Apple II+. At this time, it had approximately 400 employees in three plants (two in São Paulo and one in the Zona Franca de Manaus) and more than 700 peddlers spread for all Brazil. 

Although the logo of the company is identical to the earlier Microdigital Ltd of the United Kingdom the company is not related.

Line of products 
A not extensive list of Microdigital's products:

Home computers 
 TK80 (1981)
 TK82 (1981)
 TK82C (1981)
 TK83 (1982)
 TK85 (1983)
 TKS800 (1984 - vapourware)
 TK90X (1985)
 TK95 (1986)

Personal computers 
 TK 2000 (1984)
 TK 2000/II (1985)
 TK-3000 IIe (1986)
 TK-3000 IIe Compact (1987)
 TK EXTended (1987)
 LT 1600 D (?)
 TK Portable (?)

Peripherals 
 TK Printer (vapourware)

Video-games 
 Onyx (1984)- Colecovision clone, never launched
 Onyx Jr (1985)

Software 
Microdigital sold software (almost always pirate copies of foreign programs) through its subsidiary, Microsoft.

Others 
 Microdigital Rhythmic 2 Portable Keyboard

References

External links 
  Microdigital by Chema Matas in MicroHobby.com
  Micodigital's ads from the 1980s

Electronics companies of Brazil
Defunct computer companies of Brazil
Defunct manufacturing companies of Brazil
Manufacturing companies based in São Paulo